Tammy Lynn Armstrong (born March 26, 1974) is a Canadian poet and novelist. She is most noted for her 2002 collection Bogman's Music, which was a shortlisted finalist for the Governor General's Award for English-language poetry at the 2002 Governor General's Awards.

Originally from St. Stephen, New Brunswick, Armstrong was educated at the University of British Columbia and the University of New Brunswick.

Career 
Armstrong has published the poetry collections Unravel (2004), Take Us Quietly (2006) and The Scare in the Crow (2010), and the novels Translations: Aístreann (2002) and Pye-Dogs (2008).

In 2017, Armstrong's Hermit God Spot made the longlist for the CBC Poetry Prize.

See also

Canadian literature
Canadian poetry
List of Canadian poets
List of Canadian writers

References

1974 births
Living people
21st-century Canadian poets
21st-century Canadian short story writers
21st-century Canadian women writers
Canadian women poets
Canadian women short story writers
People from St. Stephen, New Brunswick
Writers from New Brunswick
University of British Columbia alumni
University of New Brunswick alumni